Green Left (EV) is an eco-socialist political party active in Catalonia formed on 13 March 2021 as the successor of Initiative for Catalonia Greens.

History 
On 22 July 2019, the commercial court number 7 of Barcelona declared Initiative for Catalonia Greens (ICV) in bankruptcy after requesting it for a debt of 9.2 million euros.

On 2 July 2020, former ICV members announced the founding of a new party and that it would be part of the En Comú Podem, with David Cid, Marta Ribas and Ernest Urtasun being members of the new party.

On 13 March 2021, the party held its founding assembly with members of the Unified Socialist Party of Catalonia (PSUC), the former Initiative for Catalonia Greens (ICV) and Left-Nationalist Agreement (ENE).

See also 
 Unified Socialist Party of Catalonia
 Initiative for Catalonia Greens
 United and Alternative Left

References

External links

2021 establishments in Spain
Catalan nationalist parties
Ecosocialist parties
European Green Party
Global Greens
Green political parties in Spain
Left-wing nationalist parties
Political parties established in 2021
Political parties in Catalonia
Progressive parties
Republican parties in Spain
Socialist parties in Catalonia